Messola Pogorelsky (born 7 March 1862) was a Russian physician and writer.

Pogorelsky was born to a Jewish family in Bobruisk, and educated at the gymnasium of his native town. He completed his medical degree at the University of Saint Vladimir in Kiev in 1890. In the same year he was appointed crown rabbi of Kherson, a position which he held until 1893. He was a prolific writer on medical and on Jewish subjects. His medical essays appeared in the St. Petersburger Medicinische Wochenschrift, the Russkaya Meditzina, and other Russian periodicals.

Selected bibliography

References
 

1862 births
20th-century deaths
Year of death unknown
19th-century Belarusian people
19th-century male writers from the Russian Empire
19th-century physicians from the Russian Empire
20th-century Russian physicians
19th-century scientists from the Russian Empire
Belarusian Jews
Belarusian physicians
Jewish physicians
Jewish scientists from the Russian Empire
Jewish writers from the Russian Empire
Parapsychologists
People from Babruysk
Russian medical writers
Taras Shevchenko National University of Kyiv alumni